The minister of immigration, refugees and citizenship is a minister of the Crown in the Canadian Cabinet. The minister is responsible for Immigration, Refugees and Citizenship Canada, which is the federal department responsible for immigration, refugee and citizenship issues in Canada.

The current minister is Sean Fraser.

Prior to the current position, the portfolios responsible for immigration in Canada throughout history were titled: Immigration and Colonization (1917–36), Mines and Resources (1936–50), Citizenship and Immigration (1950–66), Manpower and Immigration (1966–77), and of Employment and Immigration (1977–96). The office as it exists today was created in 1994 by the Department of Citizenship and Immigration Act.

As of 2 July 2013, the Immigration, Refugees and Citizenship portfolio inherited primary responsibility for Passport Canada and the administration of the Canadian Passport Order from the Foreign Affairs and International Trade portfolio. The Immigration and Refugee Board of Canada, though independent, also reports to the minister.

Historical overview
There have been several offices throughout history responsible for immigration in Canada.

From 1917 to 1936, the office responsible for citizenship and immigration in Canada was the minister of immigration and colonization. The portfolios thereafter fell under the ministers of mines and resources and of reconstruction and supply until 1950, when the office of the minister of citizenship and immigration was established.

In 1966, the Citizenship and Immigration ministry was largely replaced by that of the minister of manpower and immigration, who would keep responsibility over immigration until 1977. From then on, the immigration portfolio would fall under the minister of employment and immigration until 1996.

In January 1991, the office of minister of multiculturalism and citizenship was created, adopting responsibility over citizenship matters. This office lasted until 1994, when the post of minister of citizenship and immigration was resuscitated by the Department of Citizenship and Immigration Act, substantially revamping the immigration and citizenship portfolios. In 2008, the office was renamed to the minister of citizenship, immigration and multiculturalism, only to again drop the multiculturalism portfolio in 2013.

As of 2 July 2013, the Citizenship and Immigration portfolio inherited primary responsibility for Passport Canada and the administration of the Canadian Passport Order from the Foreign Affairs and International Trade portfolio.

On 4 November 2015, the name of the department has changed from Citizenship and Immigration Canada to Immigration, Refugees and Citizenship Canada.

List of ministers 
The office of minister of citizenship and immigration was created in 1950 by "Statute 13 George VI, c. 16". That office was abolished in 1966, and replaced by the minister of manpower and immigration. The office responsible for immigration in Canada would again be titled minister of citizenship and immigration," with its creation in 1994 by the Department of Citizenship and Immigration Act (Statute 42–43 Elizabeth II, c. 31), succeeding the minister of employment and immigration.

Though having its name changed in 2015 to minister of immigration, refugees and citizenship, the office created in 1994 as the minister of citizenship and immigration" is still the one that is currently in effect and is responsible for Immigration, Refugees and Citizenship Canada.

The following immigration ministers are those who assumed the position under the office that was created in 1994.

Preceding offices responsible for immigration 
There have been several offices throughout history responsible for immigration in Canada. 

Prior to the current position, the offices responsible for immigration in Canada throughout history include the minister of immigration and colonization (1917–1936), minister of mines and resources (1936–1950), minister of citizenship and immigration (1950–1966), minister of manpower and immigration (1966–1977), minister of employment and immigration (1977–1996).

Minister of Immigration and Colonization (1917–36) 
The minister of immigration and colonization was an office in the Cabinet of Canada from 1917 to 1936, superseded by the minister of mines and resources.

After 1950, the position has been succeeded by minister of citizenship and immigration (1950–1966), minister of manpower and immigration (1966–1977), and minister of employment and immigration (1977–1996).

Minister of Mines and Resources (1936–50) 

The minister of mines and resources was a cabinet portfolio from 1936 to 1950 that had absorbed the responsibilities belonging to the offices of minister of immigration and colonization, as well as of the minister of the interior, minister of mines, and superintendent-general of Indian affairs. The last minister of immigration and colonization, Thomas Alexander Crerar, remained in office under the new title of minister of mines and resources.

Citizenship and Immigration (1950–66) 
The office of minister of citizenship and immigration came in force on 18 January 1950, and would be abolished and replaced by the minister of manpower and immigration as of 1 October 1966.

Following the minister of manpower and immigration (1966–1977) and the minister of employment and immigration (1977–1996), the office responsible for immigration in Canada would again be titled minister of citizenship and immigration, which was created in 1994 and is currently in effect (though changing its name to the minister immigration, refugees and citizenship as of 2015).

Minister of Manpower and Immigration (1966–77) 
Minister of Manpower and Immigration was a former position in the Cabinet of Canada from 1966 to 1977. The position was created after the minister of citizenship and immigration was dissolved in 1966. It was abolished and replaced with the minister of employment and immigration in 1977.

Minister of Employment and Immigration (1977–96) 
The minister of employment and immigration was an office in the Cabinet of Canada, in operation from 1977 to 1996, and was first held by Bud Cullen, who continued from his preceding role as the minister of manpower and immigration. 

On 12 July 1996, the office of the minister of employment and immigration was abolished and replaced with the office of minister of human resources development. The portfolio for immigration was transferred to the office of minister of citizenship and immigration following the reorganization of the government and formation of the department for Citizenship and Immigration Canada.

See also

Immigration to Canada
Minister of Immigration (Quebec)
Canadian citizenship

References 

Immigration, Refugees and Citizenship
Immigration to Canada
Canada